The 1978 US Open was a tennis tournament played on outdoor hard courts at the USTA National Tennis Center in New York City in New York in the United States. It was the 98th edition of the US Open and the third Grand Slam tennis event of the year. The tournament was held from August 28 to September 10, 1978, and the singles titles were won by Jimmy Connors and Chris Evert. This was the first year the US Open was played at the National Tennis Center in Flushing Meadows after having been organized at the West Side Tennis Club venue in Forest Hills since 1915. It was also the first time the tournament was played on hard courts, as opposed to much of its history on grass and a brief stint, from 1975 through 1977, on clay.

Seniors

Men's singles

 Jimmy Connors defeated  Björn Borg, 6–4, 6–2, 6–2 
It was Connors 5th career Grand Slam title, and his 3rd US Open title.

Women's singles

 Chris Evert defeated  Pam Shriver, 7–5, 6–4 
It was Evert's 8th career Grand Slam title, and her 4th (consecutive) US Open title.

Men's doubles

 Bob Lutz /  Stan Smith defeated  Marty Riessen /  Sherwood Stewart, 1–6, 7–5, 6–3

Women's doubles

 Billie Jean King /  Martina Navratilova defeated  Kerry Melville Reid /  Wendy Turnbull, 7–6, 6–4

Mixed doubles

 Betty Stöve /  Frew McMillan defeated  Billie Jean King /  Ray Ruffels, 6–3, 7-6

Juniors

Boys' singles
 Per Hjertquist defeated  Stefan Simonsson, 7-6, 1-6, 7-6

Girls' singles
 Linda Siegel defeated  Ivanna Madruga, 6–4, 6-4

Notes

References

External links
Official US Open website

 
 

 
US Open
US Open (tennis) by year
US Open
US Open
US Open
US Open